The ceremonial county of Tyne and Wear has returned 12 MPs to the UK Parliament since 2010. It was created under the Local Government Act 1972, which came into effect on 1 April 1974, comprising the urban areas around the mouths of the Rivers Tyne and Wear, previously parts of the historic counties of Northumberland and Durham.

Numbers of seats 
The table below shows the number of MPs representing Tyne and Wear at each major redistribution of seats affecting the county.

1Since 1950, seats have been classified as County or Borough Constituencies.

2Approximate equivalent number of constituencies. Prior to the redistribution coming into effect for the 1983 general election, several constituencies were split between Tyne and Wear and the counties of Northumberland or Durham.

Constituencies timeline

Boundary reviews

1974 
At the time of its creation, Tyne and Wear contained the equivalent of approximately 14 constituencies. North of the River Tyne, previously part of Northumberland, they comprised the four Newcastle upon Tyne constituencies and those of Wallsend and Tynemouth1, together with small areas of Hexham and Blyth. South of the River Tyne and around the River Wear, previously part of Durham, they comprised the two Gateshead and two Sunderland constituencies and those of Blaydon, Jarrow and South Shields, together with most of Houghton-le-Spring and parts of Chester-le-Street.

1 Apart from the small community of Seaton Sluice.

1983 
The next change to parliamentary constituency boundaries, following the recommendations of the Third Periodic Review of Westminster constituencies, reflected the change in county boundaries and reorganisation of local government authorities in 1974. The review did not come into effect for a further nine years, at the 1983 general election, and resulted in a reduction of one seat. This was achieved by effectively abolishing the existing seats of Newcastle upon Tyne Central and Gateshead West and creating a new constituency named Tyne Bridge which spanned the River Tyne.

The boundaries of Newcastle upon Tyne Central were completely redrawn with only a small part of the existing constituency retained. The majority of the old seat was incorporated into Tyne Bridge, with eastern parts transferred to Newcastle upon Tyne East. The reconstituted seat comprised the bulk of the existing Newcastle upon Tyne North seat, combined with parts of the abolished constituency of Newcastle upon Tyne West and small area transferred from Wallsend.

Newcastle upon Tyne North was also reconstituted, with no part of the existing constituency retained. The new boundaries comprised about half of the abolished Newcastle upon Tyne West seat, including Newburn, together with areas which had been absorbed into the metropolitan borough, transferred from Wallsend (South Gosforth) and Hexham (part of Castle Ward). Wallsend now included a small area transferred from Blyth (Earsdon and Backworth).

The abolished seat of Gateshead West was absorbed into Gateshead East and Tyne Bridge. Blaydon gained the former parishes of Birtley and Lamesley from the abolished constituency of Chester-le-Street. Houghton-le-Spring gained the new town of Washington, which had also been part of Chester-le-Street, and lost the town of Seaham and surrounding communities, which had been retained in County Durham (transferred to Easington). It was consequently renamed Houghton and Washington.

Parts of Jarrow were transferred to South Shields to equalise their electorates. Sunderland North, Sunderland South and Tynemouth were largely unchanged.

1997 
Under the Fourth Periodic Review, the following transfers between constituencies were made:

2010 
The Fifth Review resulted in a further reduction in the county’s representation, from 13 to 12 MPs, with the abolition of the cross-river constituency of Tyne Bridge.

The part of Tyne Bridge to the north of the River Tyne was transferred to Newcastle upon Tyne Central, with eastern parts of this seat being moved back to the re-established seat of Newcastle upon Tyne East (replacing Newcastle upon Tyne East and Wallsend). The North Tyneside borough wards of Wallsend and Northumberland were transferred back out to the North Tyneside constituency, with Valley ward moving to Tynemouth.

The majority of the Tyne Bridge constituency, south of the Tyne, was incorporated into a re-established Gateshead constituency. This also included the Gateshead borough wards in the abolished constituency of Gateshead East and Washington West, with the exception of the Pelaw and Heworth ward which was transferred to Jarrow. The South Tyneside borough ward of Whitburn and Marsden was transferred from Jarrow to South Shields.

The boundaries of the three constituencies in the city of Sunderland were radically redrawn with Sunderland North, Sunderland South, and Houghton and Washington East being replaced by Sunderland Central, Houghton and Sunderland South, and Washington and Sunderland West. The last of these included the two Washington wards which had been in Gateshead East and Washington West, thus reuniting the town of Washington.

Blaydon and Newcastle upon Tyne North were affected by ward boundary changes.

Maps

Communities Timeline 
The table below shows which constituencies represented selected communities within the current county from 1885 onwards.

See also 

 List of parliamentary constituencies in Tyne and Wear
 History of parliamentary constituencies and boundaries in Northumberland
 History of parliamentary constituencies and boundaries in Durham

References 

Parliamentary constituencies in Tyne and Wear (historic)